The Winnipeg Art Gallery (WAG) is an art museum in Winnipeg, Manitoba, Canada. Its permanent collection includes over 24,000 works from Canadian, Indigenous Canadian, and international artists. The museum also holds the world's largest collection of Inuit art. In addition to exhibits for its collection, the museum has organized and hosted a number of travelling arts exhibitions. Its building complex consists of a main building that includes  of indoor space and the adjacent  Qaumajuq building.

The present institution was formally incorporated in 1963, although it traces its origins to the Winnipeg Museum of Fine Arts, an art museum opened to the public in 1912 by the Winnipeg Development and Industrial Bureau. The bureau opened the Winnipeg School of Arts in the following year, and operated the art museum and art school until 1923, when the two entities were incorporated as the Winnipeg Gallery and School of Arts. In 1926, the Winnipeg Art Gallery Association was formed to assist the institution in operating its museum component. The Winnipeg Gallery and School of Art was dissolved in 1950, although its collection was loaned indefinitely to the Winnipeg Art Gallery Association, who continued to exhibit it.

In 1963, the Winnipeg Art Gallery Association was formally incorporated as the Winnipeg Art Gallery by the Legislative Assembly of Manitoba. The museum moved to its present location in September 1971, with the opening of a purpose-built building designed by Gustavo da Roza. In 2021, the museum opened a Michael Maltzan-designed Qaumajuq building in order to house the museum's Inuit art collection.

History

Background

The city's first serious art gallery was first opened in the former Manitoba Hotel (built  by the Northern Pacific Railway), located at Main and Water Ave. An area of the hotel was set aside for an art studio. The art gallery was organized by Cora Moore, who upon return from a trip to Toronto, organized a Winnipeg branch of the Women's Art Association of Canada and subsequently an artists group for men. The first art exhibit took place in February 1895. The art gallery featured art from artists from Manitoba, as well as Toronto, Montreal, New York, London, and Paris. The art gallery was shut down after the Manitoba Hotel burned down in 1899.

Efforts to create another art museum began in 1902, after the Manitoba Society of Artists was formed, and its members began to lobby for the creation of a provincial civic and arts institution. In addition to the Manitoba Society of Artists, the Winnipeg-branch of the Western Art Association adopted a mandate that promoted the creation of an art museum to art from Manitoba, and the rest of Canada in 1908.

Gallery and school of art
After the first phase of the Board of Trade building was completed in April 1912, the Winnipeg Development and Industrial Bureau unveiled plans for its second phase expansion of the building, which featured a space designated for an art museum. The art museum, named the Winnipeg Museum of Fine Arts, was formally opened by the Mayor of Winnipeg Richard Deans Waugh, the Lieutenant Governor of Manitoba Douglas Cameron, and the president of the Winnipeg Development and Industrial Bureau on 16 December 1912. The first exhibition held at the museum featured 275 works from the Royal Canadian Academy of Arts.

Building upon the success of the art museum, the bureau opened the Winnipeg School of Arts in the same building on 21 June 1913. The art school, and museum operated as separate departments of the same institution, initially controlled by the bureau. The institution became independent of the bureau in April 1923, when it was formally incorporated as the Winnipeg Gallery and School of Art by the Legislative Assembly of Manitoba.

However, by the mid 1920s, the institution faced financial difficulties, and was forced to suspend most museum operations in 1926, with its remaining expenses for the museum being paid towards insurance, campaigns to increase membership, and sundry repairs. The museum's permanent collection was held by the School of Art in trust while the museum was closed. In August 1926, the Winnipeg Art Gallery Association was formed to assist the museum in its operations. The gallery resumed normal operations on 22 April 1932, when it was reopened at the Civic Auditorium's (the present Manitoba Archives Building) western wing. The School of Art remained in the Board of Trade building until its demolition in 1935, and was relocated twice, in 1936, and 1938.

In June 1950, the Winnipeg Gallery and the School of Art was formally dissolved, with the School of Art being incorporated into the University of Manitoba. Works collected for the former institution's permanent collection were loaned to the Winnipeg Art Gallery Association for an "indefinite" period, who continued to exhibit the collection at the Civic Auditorium.

Winnipeg Art Gallery (1963–present)
On 6 May 1963, the Winnipeg Art Gallery Association was formally incorporated as the Winnipeg Art Gallery by the Legislative Assembly of Manitoba. In 1965, discussions were raised to move the art gallery from the Civic Auditorium, although the institution opposed a proposed move to the Manitoba Centennial Centre, along with the Centennial Concert Hall, and the Manitoba Museum. The Winnipeg Art Gallery criticized the proposal stating that, "the politicians of the city have set various arts groups on each other, and the result has been many objections. We of the Arts Gallery are sitting tight — but we are not sitting still."

In 1967, the museum acquired a triangular plot of land across from the Civic Auditorium, and launched a competition for architects to submit designs for a new building. The proposed design required the demolition of several buildings on the proposed site, including an unused service station, and the Cinema Centre building. Work on a new museum building began in 1969.

The gallery moved to its present location in 1971, into a building designed by Canadian architect Gustavo Da Roza. Along with expanding the exhibition spaces, the new building also allowed for the museum's storage conservation unit to be housed in the same building, as opposed to an off-site location. Construction for the building cost approximately C$4.5 million, with the funding coming from the federal and provincial governments, private donations, as well as a public campaign to raise funds. The building was officially opened to the public on 25 September 1971 by Princess Margaret, Countess of Snowdon.

In October 1995, the museum expanded its property by acquiring the former Medical Mall building adjacent to its own building, and used it to house the museum's art studio programs.

In 2012, the museum, and the National Gallery of Canada entered into a three-year agreement to exhibit works from the National Gallery's collection at the Winnipeg Art Gallery. In November 2015, the Government of Nunavut reached a five-year loan agreement with the Government of Manitoba, to exhibit the Government of Nunavut's collection of 8,000 works at the Winnipeg Art Gallery. The Government of Nunavut collection formed in 1999, and was originally housed in the Prince of Wales Northern Heritage Centre in Yellowknife. The Government of Nunavut originally planned to house the collection in a climate controlled facility in Iqaluit, although those plans were later abandoned.

In June 2016, the museum opened a retail space, known as WAG@The Forks, in an effort to promote and sell Inuit art at The Forks. The retail space was the result of a partnership formed between the Government of Nunavut, and the Winnipeg Art Gallery. In September 2016, the museum, and the Assiniboine Park Conservancy opened WAG@ThePark at the Assiniboine Park pavilion. WAG@ThePark was opened as a partnership between the Winnipeg Art Gallery and the Assiniboine Park Conservancy, which saw the museum curate exhibitions in the building. Most of the works from the exhibitions at WAG@ThePark is from the Conservancy's collection, although some Inuit works from the museum's permanent collection were also exhibited at the pavilion.

In 2018, a lost painting by Alfred Munnings was located in the permanent collections of the Winnipeg Art Gallery. The painting depicts Brigadier General R.W. Paterson's horse, Peggy, during the First World War, and was lost shortly after a Royal Academy of Arts exhibition in 1919, which featured that piece, and 43 other works from Munnings. The lost painting was identified in the Winnipeg Art Gallery's permanent collection after a public appeal to locate the work was issued by the British National Army Museum; in their efforts to recreate the 1919 exhibition. According to the Winnipeg Art Gallery, the painting entered its collection in 1984, donated to them by Paterson's children.

The former Medical Mall building was demolished in 2017 in order to accommodate the construction of a new building to house the museum's collection of Inuit art, known as Qaumajuq, which broke ground in May 2018. The groundbreaking ceremony for the new building was held in May 2018, and featured the lighting of a qulliq, an Inuit drum dance, and throat singing. Cost for the construction of Qaumajuq is estimated to be C$65 million, with C$35 million obtained from the federal, provincial, and municipal government, and the remaining funds covered by public and private donors. The centre would be the first museum building in the world dedicated to Inuit art upon its opening. 
Qaumajuq was opened to the public on 25 March 2021.

Grounds
The main property the Winnipeg Art Gallery presently occupies was acquired in 1967. The museum's main building was opened on the property on 25 September 1971. In 1995, the property was expanded after the museum acquired the former Medical Mall south of the main building. In 2017, the former Medical Mall was demolished to make way for Qaumajuq, a building centred around Inuit art. The main building and Qaumajuq will be connected by a skyway between the two buildings.

Main building

The main building for the Winnipeg Art Gallery was opened in September 1971, and was designed by Gustavo da Roza in a late-modernist style. During the design and construction process, da Roza partnered with Number Ten Architects, who provided architectural drafting and project management.

The building's exterior was designed as an iceberg-shaped "triangular mass," with an austere low silhouette, and almost no windows throughout its exterior. The building's exterior walls are sloped to reflect sunlight, and uses "aggressive" geometric angles. A wedge that protrudes from the "main mass" forms the entrance to the main building. Most of the building was built from poured-in-place, reinforced concrete and clad in Tyndall stone. According to da Roza, the use of Tyndall stone for the load bearing wall was selected to help affirm the "character of [the] northern prairie environment." Tyndall stone is also used extensively for the walls and floor of the interior, and the lounges in the building's second floor.

The interior of the gallery was designed to help maintain and preserve works exhibited in the building, and includes mechanical systems that maintain the atmosphere of the building at an appropriate temperature and humidity for the works. As a result of the building's angular shape, nearly every room in the building has a different shape from the other rooms in the building. The interior of the building features  of exhibition space. Most of the building's viewing galleries are located on the third floor, which also features a skylight set from the building's rooftop garden; whereas the mezzanine level is dedicated to smaller exhibition spaces, the museum's library, and offices.

The ground level, known as Ferdinand Eckhardt Hall, is a large space sheathed in saw-cut Tyndall stone, and houses the museum's gift shop and art rental store, conservation lab, the main lobby, and a 320-seat auditorium complete this level. The museum's restaurant facilities and access to the rooftop garden are located on the building's fourth floor, while its storage for its collections are located in the building's basement.

Qaumajuq 

The museum property is also home to Qaumajuq, a four-storey  building, situated to the south of the main building at Memorial Boulevard and St. Mary Avenue. Michael Maltzan, the principal architect for Michael Maltzan Architecture, was contracted to design the building in 2012. PCL Construction was contracted to construct the building. Construction for the building began in late May 2018, after the former building that occupied the site, the Medical Mall, was demolished in 2017. The building opened in March 2021.

The design of Qaumajuq was intended to both complement the existing main building, as well as reflect where most of the works intended to be housed in the building originated from. The building's exterior is clad in glass and off-white stone, although concrete and steel were also used as building materials. The skylights are designed to emit light on its exterior side, glowing "like a lantern".

A curved designed is used throughout the interior, as a reflection of Northern Canada's "openness". The building's  atrium features a serpentine steel frame of the building's three-storey visible storage for works for items in the Inuit collection not on exhibit. The visible storage is adjacent to the building's entrance on the corner of St. Mary's Avenue and Memorial Boulevard, with a lecture room, café, and reading room adjacent to the building's atrium. The building's second level includes a 90-seat theatre, a library, and a learning commons on the second floor. Five indoor, and two outdoor art studios are situated on the buildings uppermost level. The upper roof level of the building is also designed to provide space for exhibitions, public performances.

Permanent collection 
As of March 2015, the Winnipeg Art Gallery's permanent collection includes over 24,000 works from Canadian, and international artists. Approximately 70 percent of the permanent collection was gifted to the museum by private donors. Summer Afternoon, the Prairie by Lionel LeMoine FitzGerald was the first work purchased by the museum for its permanent collection.

The collection is organized into several collection areas, Canadian art, decorative arts, Inuit art, international art, photography, and works on paper. The photography collection was made a specialized area of its permanent collection during the 1980s. Its photography collection includes 1,400 works, most of which originated from Canadian artists in the latter half of the 20th century. The museum's works on paper collection contains approximately 6,000 items in its collection, encompassing historical to contemporary works by international artists, and Canadian artists, whose works make up the majority of the works on prints collection.

Canadian art

The museum's Canadian collection includes works from Canadian artists dating back to the 1820s to the present day. The museum's permanent collection includes 200 works by Canadian artists from 1820 to 1910. Work by Canadian artists prior to the 20th century in the museum's collection include those created by Maurice Cullen, Mary Riter Hamilton, John A. Hammond, Robert Harris, Otto Reinhold Jacobi, Paul Kane, Cornelius Krieghoff, James Wilson Morrice, Lucius Richard O'Brien, William Raphael, George Agnew Reid, Peter Rindisbacher, Frederick Arthur Verner, and Homer Watson.

The collection also features a sizable collection of Canadian modern art (works produced from 1910 to 1979) including works by artists of the Winnipeg Gallery and School of Art, Painters Eleven, and the Regina Five. The museum's Canadian modern art collection also includes a number of works from the Group of Seven, including over 1,000 works from Group of Seven member Lionel LeMoine FitzGerald. Other works in the collection by modern Canadian artists include Bertram Brooker, Emily Carr, Charles Comfort, Ivan Eyre, Prudence Heward, William Kurelek, David Milne, Walter J. Phillips, Tony Tascona and William H. Lobchuk and other printmakers of the Grand Western Canadian Screen Shop.

The museum's also has a collection contemporary art from Canadian artists, most of which is made up equally of prints and paintings, although it also includes collages, drawings, installations, sculptures, and videos. The museum's collection of contemporary Canadian art includes works by Eleanor Bond, Aganetha Dyck, Cliff Eyland, Wanda Koop, Janet Werner, and the Royal Art Lodge.

Decorative art
As of March 2015, the museum's decorative art collection includes more than 4,000 works of ceramic, glass, metal, and textiles from the 17th century to the present. The decorative arts collection began in the 1950s, when the museum was bequeathed a collection of decorative works from Melanie Bolton-Hill. The collection includes 1,500 ceramics from British artisans in the 18th and 19th centuries; nearly 1,000 Art Nouveau and Art Deco-styled glass objects from the late 19th century to the early 20th century; and 500 works of silver from British and Canadian silversmiths.

International art
The museum's international art collection is made up of paintings from American and European artists from the 19th and 20th centuries. The museum's international collection includes the Gort Collection, which features 19 panel paintings, and 5 tapestries from Northern Renaissance artists in the 15th and 16th centuries. The Gort Collection was bequeathed to the museum in 1973, although prior to that, it was already on long-term loan to the institution since 1954. The museum's international art collection also includes works by Alexander Archipenko, Eugène Boudin, Marc Chagall, Jean-Baptiste-Camille Corot, Raoul Dufy, Henri Fantin-Latour, Dan Flavin, Sol LeWitt, and Henry Moore.

Inuit art

The Winnipeg Art Gallery's permanent collection also includes the world's largest collection of Inuit art, numbering over 13,000 works in March 2019. Inuit carvings make up nearly two-thirds of the museum's Inuit collection, which includes 7,500 antler, bone, ivory, and stone carvings, dozens of hand-sewn wall hangings. Other works in the collection includes 3,000 prints and drawings from Inuit artists.

The first works for the museum's Inuit collection was acquired in thet 1950s, although the museum's first substantial acquisition of Inuit works came in 1960, when George Swinton donated 130 sculptures to the museum. The collection was further bolstered in 1971, when the Jerry Twomey Collection, featuring 4,000 Inuit works, was donated to the museum. In 1989, Indian and Northern Affairs Canada (later renamed Indigenous and Northern Affairs Canada) donated 1,400 prints and drawings from Inuit artists to the museum.

Since 1972, the museum has appointed a full-time curator to oversee its collection of Inuit art. Most of the works from the museum's Inuit collection was stored in the basement storage space of its main building, although the museum planned to move these pieces to Qaumajuq's visible storage vault and exhibit. Qaumajuq was opened to the public in 2021.

Quamajuq's inaugural exhibit was named INUA, meaning "life force" or "spirit" in some Arctic dialects. INUA is also an acronym for "Inuit Nunangat Ungammuaktut Atautikkut" (Inuit Moving Forward Together). The lead curator of the all-Inuit curatorial team designing the exhibit was Heather Igloliorte. Each of the four curators represented an area of the north. Igloliorte comes from Nunatsiavut, Krista Ulujuk Zawadski from Nunavut, Asinnajaq from Nunavik, and Kablusiak is Inuvialuit. A focus in creating the exhibit was to honour ancestors and families and to connect people living today to "that trajectory of who our ancestors are and who we will become ancestors for".

Library and archives
The museum also operates a library and archives, maintained by its curatorial department. Known as the Clara Lander Library, its holdings include books, and records that assists in the museum's educational mandate; whereas its archives contains administrative, curatorial, and educational documents relating to the museum. Access to the Clara Lander Library is free of charge, although a written request must be submitted to the museum in order to access its materials.

Selected works

See also
 List of art museums
 List of museums in Manitoba

Notes

References

Further reading

External links

Winnipeg Art Gallery YouTube channel

Buildings and structures in downtown Winnipeg
Buildings and structures completed in 1971
Art museums established in 1912
Art museums and galleries in Manitoba
Museums in Winnipeg
Tourist attractions in Winnipeg
Modernist architecture in Canada
Inuit art
1912 establishments in Manitoba